Rebecca or Becky Hill may refer to:

Rebecca Hill, co-author of Killing Time in St. Cloud
Becky Hill (born Rebecca Claire Hill, 1994), English singer and songwriter 
Becky Hill (curler), see 2012 United States Junior Curling Championships
Rebecca Hill (model), see List of Penthouse Pets